Gorgyra sola, the rare leaf sitter, is a butterfly in the family Hesperiidae. It is found in Sierra Leone, Liberia, Ivory Coast, Ghana, Nigeria, Cameroon, Gabon and the western part of the Democratic Republic of the Congo. The habitat consists of forests.

References

Butterflies described in 1937
Erionotini